Leonard V. Wood (March 3, 1937 – March 24, 2013) was an American politician. A Republican, he served as a member of the Florida House of Representatives representing the 38th district.

Life and career 
Wood was born in Chicago, Illinois. He attended Rollins College and Duke University School of Law.

In 1968, Wood was elected to represent the 38th district of the Florida House of Representatives, succeeding Henry W. Land. He served until 1970, when he was succeeded by Eugene Mooney.

Wood died in March 2013 in Orlando, Florida, at the age of 76.

References 

1937 births
2013 deaths
Politicians from Chicago
Republican Party members of the Florida House of Representatives
20th-century American politicians
Rollins College alumni
Duke University School of Law alumni